Mirandy Smiles is a 1918 American silent drama film directed by William C. deMille and written by Edith Kennedy based upon a short story by Belle K. Maniates. The film stars Vivian Martin, Douglas MacLean, William Freeman, and Frances Beech. The film was released on December 15, 1918, by Paramount Pictures. It is not known whether the film currently survives, which suggests that it is a lost film.

Plot
As described in a film magazine, Mirandy's mother Mrs. Judkins (Kelso) "takes in" laundry and Mirandy Judkins (Martin) scrubs the floors of the town opera house. Teddy Lawrence (MacLean), who plays the piano at the theater, is also organist at St. Mark's church. Mirandy upon Teddy's invitation attends church services and meets Rose White (Gennung), who is in love with the minister. Mirandy is given the work of laundering the surplices and is entrusted with a note to the minister pinned to one of the frocks. The not falls out, however, and is not delivered until the minister is called to marry the Boarder (Freeman) to Annie May (Beech). Mirandy and Teddy come to an understanding and manage to smile through their trials and tribulations.

Cast
Vivian Martin as Mirandy Judkins
Douglas MacLean as Teddy Lawrence
William Freeman as The Boarder
Frances Beech as Annie May 
Gean Gennung as Rose White
Elinor Hancock as Mrs. White (credited as Eleanor Hancock)
Mayme Kelso as Mrs. Judkins (credited as Maym Kelso)
Louis Willoughby as John Kennedy (credited as Lewis Willoughby)

References

External links 
 

1918 films
1910s English-language films
Silent American drama films
1918 drama films
Paramount Pictures films
Films directed by William C. deMille
American black-and-white films
American silent feature films
1910s American films